Rishtey is a 2002 Indian Hindi-language action drama film released on 6 December 2002. The film directed by Indra Kumar stars Anil Kapoor, Karisma Kapoor, Shilpa Shetty and Amrish Puri in the lead roles. The film had an average collection at the box office. The film was remade in Bengali Bangladesh as Sontrashi Munna (2005) with Manna and Moushumi.

Synopsis
Suraj Singh (Anil Kapoor), a lower-middle-class amateur fighter falls in love with the beautiful and wealthy Komal (Karishma Kapoor). They dream of a future together, but Komal's controlling father Yashpal Chaudhary (Amrish Puri) does not agree due to Suraj's social and economic status. Komal cuts all ties with her father and chooses to marry Suraj; she is soon pregnant.
Komal and her estranged father meet at a family wedding and they reconcile. Yashpal agrees to meet Suraj at the couple's home, but when they reach, they see a provocative woman (Deepshikha) inside, wearing Komal's gown. Suraj claims that he does not know her whereas the woman states that she is Suraj's mistress. Suraj tries to prove his innocence but Komal is heartbroken and goes into premature labour and gives birth to a baby boy. Yashpal fears that the child will become a lasting link between Komal and Suraj, so he conspires to have the baby killed. Suraj overpowers the hired hit men and takes his son away to safety. Yashpal lies to Komal, telling her that Suraj has kidnapped the child.

Suraj moves to an unknown place where he raises his son Karan, by taking on multiple hard labor jobs. Over time, the father and son forge a strong relationship, and Suraj tells everyone that Karan's mother is dead. One day, Suraj meets Vaijanti (Shilpa Shetty), a quirky and lively fisherwoman who falls in love with him. She tries many different things in the hope that Suraj will fall in love with her, but to no avail. Vaijanti observes a religious fast for Suraj, a ritual which is typically done by married women. Furious, Suraj informs her that his wife is still alive and he is still in love with her. Vaijanti is heart broken but still maintains her friendship with him.

Komal has been confined to her mansion by her father, where she has become very depressed and prone to fits. The doctor tells Yashpal that it will be difficult for her to heal until she finds her son. Yashpal tracks down Suraj and creates a situation in which Komal sees father and son together. Yashpal tries to get Karan kidnapped but Suraj intervenes. Suraj is then forced to explain the truth about Komal to Karan and his friends. Komal locates their home and goes there, only to be greeted by the sight of Vaijanti doing household chores. She misunderstands Vaijanti to be Suraj's lover, insults her and then leaves feeling distraught. Desperate to know her son, and spurred on by her father, Komal begins a custody battle after which she successfully gains custody of Karan. Karan is extremely upset about being separated from Suraj and refuses to reciprocate any of her affection. Yashpal throws a lavish party to celebrate the win in court, and Suraj tries to enter the premises without permission. Yashpal manhandles Karan, humiliates Suraj and has him arrested. The shocked court judge witnesses this incident and reformulates his judgement, by setting forth a condition that Suraj must earn 15 lakh rupees in three months time, in order to prove his ability to provide for Karans' needs. If this condition is met, Suraj will be awarded full custody.

Having lost his job, Suraj decides to fight in a high stakes wrestling match in order to possibly win the prize money. In the meantime, Vaijanti comes across the woman, who originally claimed to be Suraj's mistress and suffering with leprosy now. The woman confesses that she never knew Suraj and was instead hired by Yashpal to pose as Suraj's lover, something which she deeply regrets. The truth about how Yashpal ordered Karan's death on the day he was born is also revealed. Vaijanti takes the woman to Komal's mansion and clears the air. Komal then rushes to the wrestling arena, but it has already begun. Suraj is beaten badly but regains strength upon seeing Komal. He ultimately wins and they reconcile.

Cast 

 Anil Kapoor as Suraj Singh, Karan's Father & Komal's Husband
 Karisma Kapoor as Komal Singh, Karan's Mother & Suraj's Wife and Yashpal's Daughter
 Shilpa Shetty as Vaijanti, Suraj's Love Interest
 Jibraan Khan as Karan, Suraj & Komal's Son
 Amrish Puri as Yashpal Chaudhary, Komal's Father & Karan's Grandfather and the main antagonist
 Sharat Saxena as Hussain Bakshi
 Kaivalya Chheda as Hussain Bakshi's Son
 Alok Nath as Judge Gaekwad
 Sadashiv Amrapurkar as Advocate Katre
 Deepshika as Seductress Choudhary's Secretary
 Arjun Firoz Khan as Manik Trainer & Friend of Suraj
 Vishwajeet Pradhan as Madesh, Yashpal's Assistant
 Nils Allen Stewart as Scopio

Soundtrack
All track composed by duo Sanjeev-Darshan. Lyrics penned by Abbas Katka except for "Apun Ko Bas" by Sumit. The song "Apna Banana Hai" is based on "Karan Mein Nazara" from the Pakistani film Churiyan (1999), "Deewana Deewana" is based on the Egyptian singer Amr Diab's "Albi Ikhtarak", "Dilbar Dilbar" is based on the Moroccan singer Samira Said's "Al Bal", "Har Taraf Tu Hi Tu" is based on Amr Diab's "Baateref" and "Yaara Re" is based on Lebanese singer Diana Haddad's "Amaneh".

Box office

Award and nominations
48th Filmfare Awards
Best Supporting Actress - Shilpa Shetty

References

External links
 

2002 films
2000s Hindi-language films
Indian romantic drama films
Films directed by Indra Kumar
Films scored by Sanjeev Darshan
Indian pregnancy films
Indian courtroom films
Films about domestic violence
2002 romantic drama films